The Primera Federación, formerly known as Primera División RFEF, is the third tier of the Spanish football league system beginning with the 2021–22 season. It is administered by the Royal Spanish Football Federation. It is below the top two professional leagues, the Primera División (also known as La Liga) and the Segunda División, and above the Segunda Federación and Tercera Federación.

History 
In 2020, the Royal Spanish Football Federation announced the creation of three new divisions, two semi-professional and one amateur: the Primera División RFEF as the new third tier of the Spanish system; the Segunda División RFEF as the new fourth tier, broadly using the same format as the Segunda División B created in 1977; and the Tercera División RFEF as the fifth tier, along the same lines as the Tercera División from 1977 whereby groups are limited to teams from each of the nation's autonomous communities and is administered by a local body.

On 30 June 2022, after just one season of existence, Primera División RFEF was renamed to Primera Federación.

League format 
The Primera Federación is made up of a total of 40 clubs divided into two groups of 20 teams distributed by geographical proximity, initially with a north-west/south-east split. In its first season, 4 teams will be relegated from the Segunda División (La Liga 2) and the remaining will come from the Segunda División B.

Like the other Spanish divisions, it takes place annually, beginning at the end of August or early September, and ending in May or June of the following year. The twenty teams in each group play each other twice, home and away, for a total of thirty-eight matches. At the end of the season, the seven teams that accumulate the most points in each group, excluding reserve teams, qualify for the next edition of the Copa del Rey. At the end of the season a total of four teams are promoted to the second tier with the champions in each group achieve automatic promotion to Segunda División. The second to fifth place teams will play promotion play-offs to the second division, where two of eight teams win the play-offs and are promoted to Segunda División. The bottom five in each division are relegated to the fourth tier.

Reserve teams eligibility 
Reserve teams can participate in the Primera Federación if their first teams compete in a higher division, but cannot compete in the same division. If a team is relegated or promoted to the same division, the reserve team will be denied promotion or automatically relegated to ensure they remain one division separate.

Clubs 

The member clubs of the Primera Federación for the 2022–23 season are listed below.

Seasons

Bold: overall champion

Champions and promotions

Bold: overall titles

Top scorers
Goals in playoffs are not counted.

References

External links 
 Official website RFEF 

 
3
Spain
Semi-professional sports leagues
Sports leagues established in 2021
2021 establishments in Spain